Franz Paul Koch (1 September 1898 in Munich - 28 April 1959) was a German cinematographer.

In 1913, Koch was hired in a production of the Munich film pioneer Peter Ostermayr, and over the years he learned his trade as a cameraman. In 1920 he made his first film as chief cameraman for the company Emelka. Koch also worked for other film companies in Munich, where he collaborated frequently with the local directors Franz Osten and Franz Seitz.

He was the cinematographer for many Ludwig Ganghofer adaptions, film comedies and dramas and was also involved in the propaganda films SA-Mann Brand and Leni Riefenstahl's Triumph des Willens. From 1937 to 1941 he was a cameraman for all films with Hans Albers as the main character, which he worked with until the war, also with Hans Schweikart.

Selected filmography

External links 
  

1898 births
1959 deaths
German cinematographers
Film people from Munich